The Norway women's national football team has represented Norway at the FIFA Women's World Cup on eight occasions in 1991, 1995, 1999, 2003, 2007, 2011, 2015 and 2019. They were runners up in 1991. They won the following tournament in 1995. They also reached the fourth place in 1999 and in 2007.

1991 World Cup

Norway had five wins and a draw in the European Championship qualification. In the quarter-final against Hungary they won 2-1 at home, followed by 0-2 away. In the European Championship finals, Denmark was defeated after scoreless 100 minutes (the regular game time was 2 × 40 minutes at that time) - on a penalty shootout.  The final against Germany also went into extra time, in which the Germans won 3-1.

In the People's Republic of China Norway was in the group with the host, Denmark and New Zealand. In the first game they lost 0-4 against the Chinese women. The second game against New Zealand was won 4-0. Linda Medalen was the first Norwegian to score a World Cup goal following an own goal by Terry McCahill. In the match for second place of the group they defeated the Danes 2-1 and thus reached the quarter-finals. Opponents in the quarter-finals were then the Italians. Norway took the lead twice, but the Italians equalized in extra time. The final score was 3-2 to Norway. In the semifinals against Sweden the Norwegians won 4-1 in the final. Final opponents were the United States, who had previously won all matches. Although Linda Medalen was able to equalize the United States's lead with her sixth goal, Michelle Akers secured the US Women's 2-1 victory with her second final goal.

Group A

Quarter-finals

Semi-finals

Final

1995 World Cup

For the World Cup in the neighboring country the Norwegians qualified as semi-finalist of the European Championship 1995. In the Qualification, Norway won five wins and a draw against Finland, Hungary and Czech Republic. In the quarter-finals, Norway prevailed with two wins against Italy and was thus qualified for the World Cup. In the semi-final they won the first leg against Sweden 4: 3, but lost in Sweden with 1: 4.

At the World Cup in Sweden, they met in the first match Nigeria and won 8-0. A 2-0 win over England followed by a 7-0 win over World Cup rookie Canada. In the quarter-final against Denmark, they then had to accept the 3-1 first goal. In the semifinals, there was then a rematch for the previous World Cup final. This time, the Norwegians had the better end for themselves and won 1-0. Thus, the United States had lost a World Cup match for the first time. Final opponent was Germany and in the pouring rain, Hege Riise and Marianne Pettersen made the decision for the Norwegians shortly before half-time. This was Norway for the first time world champion. Already with the entry into the quarterfinals, Norway had also qualified for the first women's football tournament at the Olympic Games 1996 in which only the eight best teams of the World Cup could participate.

Group B

Quarter-finals

Semi-finals

Final

1999 World Cup 

Unlike the men's World Cup, where the defending champion was automatically qualified until 2002, the defending champion had to qualify for the women's second World Cup. For the third World Cup, UEFA then set up separate qualifiers for the first time and to date the only continental association. In the qualification, Norway met the final opponent of 1995 as well as the Netherlands and England. With four wins, a draw and a defeat in Germany, Norway took first place with one point ahead of Germany and qualified directly for the World Cup. Germany, which had lost except in Norway also in the Netherlands, qualified for the playoffs of the runners-up against the Ukraine also for the World Cup finals.

In the US, the Norwegians won their opening game against World Cup newcomer Russia with 2: 1. Against Canada followed then a 7: 1 and against Japan a 4-0. In the quarter-finals Sweden was again the opponent and Norway reached the semi-finals with a 3-1 win for the third time in a row. There, China was superior and won 5-0. The match for the third place match against Brazil was scoreless for 90 minutes. Due to the subsequent final, no extra time was played and immediately a penalty shoot-out set, which Brazil won 5: 4. Fourth, however, Norway had qualified for the women's football tournament at the Olympic Games 2000 alongside the host Australia only the seven best teams in the World Cup could participate. There Norway then won the Olympic gold medal and became the second team after the USA, which was both continental champion, world champion and Olympic champion.

Group C

Quarter-finals

Semi-finals

Third place play-off

2003 World Cup

Actually, the 2003 World Cup should take place again in People's Republic of China. Due to the SARS epidemic, the tournament was temporarily relocated to the United States. Thus the World Cup took place for the second time in the USA. In the Qualification, Norway met France, Ukraine and the Czech Republic. With five wins and a draw, Norway qualified as group winners for the World Cup. The second-placed French also succeeded in the playoffs of the group second qualifying by a 2-0 and a 1-1 draw against Denmark.

In the USA, they met again in the first group match on the qualification opponents France and won 2-0. They then lost to Brazil 4-1 but lost 7-1 to South Korea's  South Korea to reach the quarter-finals as group winners. Here again the USA were the opponents and after a 0: 1 was not reached the semi-final for the first time. In this case, the United States but then failed to Germany, so that they could not defend their title. With the quarter-finals, Norway had also missed the qualification for the women's football tournament at the Olympic Games alongside the host Greece only the two best European Teams of the World Cup could participate, which Norway had no chance to defend the title as Olympic champion.

Group B

Quarter-finals

2007 World Cup

Four years later, the World Cup took place for the second time in the People's Republic of China. In the Qualification, Norway met Ukraine, Italy, Serbia and Greece. With seven wins and a draw, the Norwegians prevailed sovereign.

In the first game of the final they met Canada. After two high wins in previous finals, only 2-1 was enough and only 1-1 in the second game against Australia. However, Ghana were followed by a 7-2, with Ragnhild Gulbrandsen alone scoring three goals. Norway were group winners and met host China in the quarter-finals. With 1: 0, the Norwegians could retaliate for the semi-final defeat eight years earlier and move into the semifinals. Here they met defending champion Germany and lost 0-3. Germany was then able to win the final against Brazil and be the first team to defend the world title and remain without conceding in the tournament. Norway, however, lost the third/fourth place play-off against the United States with 1: 4 and thus for the first time in a World Cup three games. However, with the semi-final draw, Norway had secured the qualification for the women's football tournament at the Olympic Games, which was only attended by the three best European teams in the World Cup.

Group C

Quarter-finals

Semi-finals

Third place play-off

2011 World Cup

For the World Cup in Germany qualifying the Norwegians won with seven wins and a draw against the Netherlands, Belarus, Slovakia and Macedonia. It Isabell Herlovsen in the 14-0 victory over Macedonia six goals. With the 4: 0 on the penultimate round in Slovakia, Norway qualified ahead of schedule for the play-offs of the group winners, which were necessary this time. With 1: 0 and 2: 0 Ukraine was defeated and booked the ticket to the World Cup.

In Germany, Norway was wound up in a group with World Cup freshman Equatorial Guinea, runner-up Brazil and Australia. In the first game against the World Cup newcomer, the Norwegians did a long time hard and came only in the 84th minute to redeeming 1: 0, which then remained. Against Brazil followed then a 0-3 defeat. The final game against Australia was then for second place. Although Norway went 1-0 in the 56th minute, but had to accept the postponed compensation. As the Australians had the better goal difference, this draw was enough for them to move into the quarter-finals, so Norway pushed for the winner, but had to accept the 1: 2 in the 87th minute and could not compensate this. Thus Norway dropped out for the first time in the preliminary round and thus could not qualify for the women's football tournament at the Olympic Games 2012 in which only the two best European teams in the World Cup and Britain could participate as hosts. Group winners Brazil and Australia failed but both in the quarterfinals.

Group D

2015 World Cup

In the Qualification the Norwegians prevail again. In the group were the Netherlands, who qualified for the World Cup for the first time through the playoffs, Belgium, Portugal, Greece and for the first time Albania the opponents. After nine victories Norway was qualified on 13 September 2014 as the third European team for the World Cup finals. The last game against the Netherlands was then lost, but could be countered, as the Netherlands had come in the home game against Belgium only to a 1: 1.

In the draw of the groups, the Norwegians were not set and were the group B with Germany against which they had lost the last European Championship final ,Other group opponents included the World Cup newcomers Thailand and the Ivory Coast.

In the group they prevailed sovereign and was only because of the worse goal difference behind Germany second. In the second round Norway lost 1: 2 against England. Norway missed out on qualifying for the Women's Football Tournament at the 2016 Olympic Games, but still had the chance to win the third European Olympic ticket in play-offs against the three other European knockout fans , National coach Pellerud resigned from his post in August, believing the chances of qualifying for the Olympics were higher without him. These were missed in March 2016, when it was enough for only one win and two defeats and thus only the disappointing 4th place.

Group B

Round of 16

2019 World Cup

In the Qualification for the world cup, the team had to face European champions Netherlands, Ireland, Slovakia and Northern Ireland. After victories against Northern Ireland and Slovakia, the Norwegians lost 0-1 in the Netherlands. After that, they won all matches, including on the final day of the home game against the Netherlands 2-1. Although this was the direct comparison by the more away away goals for the Dutch women, but since they had come in November at home to Ireland only a goalless draw, they had - although they won all other games - in the end two points less than the Norwegians , which thus achieved the direct qualification.

Group opponents in France were the hosts as well as Nigeria and South Korea. The Norwegians started 3-0 against Nigeria, losing 2-1 to France and securing second place with a 2-1 win against South Korea. In the last sixteen they met Australia. As it was 1: 1 after 120 minutes, it came to the penalty shoot-out, the Norwegians won 4: 1. In the quarter-final against England they came in the third minute in arrears and conceded shortly before the break, the second goal. In the second half, they could not take advantage of several opportunities, but instead collected the third goal. The departure did not qualify them for the 2020 Olympics.

Group A

Round of 16

Quarter-finals

2023 World Cup

Group A

FIFA World Cup record

Goalscorers

 Own goals scored for opponents
 Trine Rønning (scored for Germany in 2007)

Notes

References

 
World Cup
Countries at the FIFA Women's World Cup